Juan María Lekuona Berasategi (Oiartzun, Guipúzcoa, 1927 - Donostia, 5 December 2005)  was a Basque poet in euskera.

He was Manuel Lekuona's nephew. In 1953 he became a priest. After his residence in Rome, where he defended his thesis, he worked in Añorga, near Donostia. He read Gabriel Aresti's books in those years and that is why his work was very orientated to social fight in the beginning, as we can see in Mindura gaur, his first book.

He was the first president of EIZIE in 1987.

His studies about bersolarism (oral Basque tradition) are very important and he became a member of Euskaltzaindia in 1988. He won several prices in life, like two Premios Euskadi de Literatura, in 1979 and 1990.

External links
Lekuona at El Poder de la Palabra (in Spanish)
Biography of Lekuona (in Basque)

1927 births
2005 deaths
Spanish male poets
20th-century Spanish poets
20th-century Spanish male writers